Pedro Miguel Assunção Martins (born 14 February 1990 in Portimão, Algarve) is a Portuguese badminton player who joined the national team in 2005. Trained at the ACD CHE Lagoense, Martins competed for Portugal at the 2012 London and 2016 Summer Olympics Men's singles event.

Achievements

BWF International Challenge/Series
Women's singles

 BWF International Challenge tournament
 BWF International Series tournament

References

External links
 
 
 Pedro Martins on Facebook

Portuguese male badminton players
1990 births
Living people
People from Portimão
Olympic badminton players of Portugal
Badminton players at the 2012 Summer Olympics
Badminton players at the 2016 Summer Olympics
Sportspeople from Faro District